The Second Machine Age: Work, Progress, and Prosperity in a Time of Brilliant Technologies is a 2014 book by Erik Brynjolfsson and Andrew McAfee which is a continuation of their book Race Against the Machine. They argue that the Second Machine Age involves the automation of a lot of cognitive tasks that make humans and software-driven machines substitutes, rather than complements. They contrast this with what they call the "First Machine Age", or Industrial Revolution, which helped make labor and machines complementary.

Some examples that the book cites include "software that grades students' essays more objectively, consistently and quickly than humans" and "news articles on Forbes.com about corporate earnings previews" — "all generated by algorithms without human involvement."

Synopsis
The authors summarize the contents of their book's 15 chapters  on pages 11 and 12 of the book itself.

The book is divided into three sections: Chapters 1 through 6 describe "the fundamental characteristics of the second machine age," based on many examples of modern use of technology. Chapters 7 through 11 describe economic impacts of technology in terms of two concepts the authors call "bounty" and "spread." What they call "bounty" is their attempt to measure the benefits of new technology in ways reaching beyond such measures as GDP, which they say is inadequate. They use "spread" as a shorthand way to describe the increasing inequality that is also resulting from widespread new technology.

Finally, in chapters 12 through 15, the authors prescribe some policy interventions that could enhance the benefits and reduce the harm of new technologies.

Reception
The Washington Post says that its strength is how it weaves micro and macroeconomics with insights from other disciplines into an accessible story. It says that the weaknesses of the book are that its policy prescriptions are "straight from the talking points that tech executives have been peddling for years on their visits to the capital", even though they are "perfectly reasonable".

References

2014 non-fiction books
Books about the Digital Revolution
Labor literature
Technology in society
Collaborative non-fiction books
W. W. Norton & Company books